Vilmos Szalai (born 11 August 1991) is a Hungarian football player who plays for III. Kerületi TVE in the Nemzeti Bajnokság II.
He played his first league match in 2010.

Club statistics

Honours
Mezőkövesd
NB II Kelet (1): 2012–13

References

External links

1991 births
Living people
Footballers from Budapest
Hungarian footballers
Association football defenders
Újpest FC players
Wormatia Worms players
Mezőkövesdi SE footballers
Diósgyőri VTK players
Soproni VSE players
Nyíregyháza Spartacus FC players
BFC Siófok players
Vecsés FC footballers
III. Kerületi TUE footballers
Nemzeti Bajnokság I players
Hungarian expatriate footballers
Expatriate footballers in Germany
Hungarian expatriate sportspeople in Germany